Unión Deportiva Las Palmas C is the second reserve team of UD Las Palmas, club based in Las Palmas, in the autonomous community of the Canary Islands. It plays in Tercera División – Group 12, holding home games at Anexo del Estadio Gran Canaria, which holds 500 spectators.

A second reserve team behind UD Las Palmas Atlético, the club was founded in 2006 and reached the highest division of regional football, the Preferente, before folding in 2010 and being re-created the following season. In 2017, the club achieved promotion to Tercera División for the first time ever.

Season to season

4 seasons in Tercera División
1 season in Tercera División RFEF

References

External links
Official website 
La Preferente profile 
Estadios de España 

UD Las Palmas
Spanish reserve football teams
Football clubs in the Canary Islands
Association football clubs established in 2006
Association football clubs disestablished in 2010
Sport in Las Palmas
2006 establishments in Spain
2010 disestablishments in Spain